Nataliya Kvasha (born 12 September 1963) is a Ukrainian rower. She competed in the women's single sculls event at the 1988 Summer Olympics.

References

1963 births
Living people
Ukrainian female rowers
Olympic rowers of the Soviet Union
Rowers at the 1988 Summer Olympics
20th-century Ukrainian women